Hassan Hayat Khan is a Pakistani actor and singer. He is best known for his role as Imran in ARY Digital's Bhool (2019). Hassan becomes the Peace Ambassador Between Pakistan and India in 2018.

Life and career 
After completing his education he started his music and created 8 commercial tracks for television and sung in half of them. His first single was "Beqadraa". In 2019 he made his debut in acting in ARY Digital's television series Bhool opposite Affan Waheed and Saboor Aly.

In 2020, Hayat married actress Sadia Ghaffar.

Discography

Filmography

Television

References

External links

1992 births
Living people
Pakistani male actors
Pakistani male singers
Male actors from Karachi
Singers from Karachi